Deepa Sannidhi (born Rahasya) is an Indian actress who mainly appears in Kannada films. She made her acting debut in the 2011 film Saarathi.

Personal life
Rahasya was born in Chikkamagalur district of Karnataka to Shashidhar and Nanda. She completed her schooling in Bangalore and is an alumna of St. Aloysius College in Mangalore.

Career
Deepa Sannidhi was in her first year in architectural engineering when she received a film offer for Saarathi, and dropped out of college to pursue a career in films. She also has some prior experience in modelling and has completed a one-year course in jewellery designing. During her acting career, Deepa simultaneously pursued a degree in English Literature through Distant Education.

She took part in the audition tests conducted by the Saarathi film team and was selected to play its lead role after undergoing two rounds of tests. While shooting for Saarathi, she signed her second film Paramathma directed by Yogaraj Bhat, which released a week after Saarathi. Paramathma also went on to become a successful venture. Deepa was chosen as the Promising Newcomer Female for Saarathi and Paramathma in The Bangalore Times Film Awards 2011. Her only 2012 release was Preetham Gubbi's Jaanu. Rediff in its review called it "Deepa Sannidhi's film all the way".

In 2014, she was first seen in Endendu Ninagagi as Soumya, "a very bold, in-your-face, today's girl". She stated that the role was "quite challenging because this is not me" but that she loved playing it. In 2015, she made her Tamil film debut in Enakkul Oruvan, a remake of Kannada film Lucia, in which she will play the character that Sruthi Hariharan did in the original. Even before her Tamil debut she signed up her next Tamil film, Vishnuvardhan's Yatchan.

Filmography

References

External links
 

People from Chikkamagaluru
Indian film actresses
Living people
Actresses in Kannada cinema
Actresses from Karnataka
21st-century Indian actresses
Year of birth missing (living people)